Medicago falcata is a plant species of the genus Medicago. It is native to much of Europe and Asia, but is found throughout the world. It forms a symbiotic relationship with the bacterium Sinorhizobium meliloti, which is capable of nitrogen fixation. Its common names include yellow lucerne, sickle alfalfa, yellow-flowered alfalfa, yellow alfalfa, sickle medick and yellow medick.

References

External links
 International Legume Database & Information Services

falcata
Plants described in 1753
Taxa named by Carl Linnaeus

Flora of Lebanon and Syria